Glorious Day is a 2014 South Korean weekend television drama series starring Park Se-young, Lee Sang-woo, Kim Mi-sook, Hwang Woo-seul-hye, and Go Woo-ri. It premiered on April 26, 2014, airing on SBS every Saturday and Sunday at 20:45 for 44 episodes.

Plot
Han Song-jung is a novelist and single mother. She raised three daughters on her own and is determined to marry them off to decent men. But in the end, Song-jung finds herself getting married as well.

Jung Da-ae is the eldest daughter; she is the perfect bride material—not only beautiful and smart, she also helped raise her younger sisters with loving care. Jung Da-jung is the middle daughter, a girl overflowing with warmth and boundless optimism, who cheers up anyone around her. Jung Da-in is the youngest daughter.

The family next door runs a rice cake store, and their eldest grandson is Seo Jae-woo. Jae-woo earns a steady income as a salaryman at a large company, and has some brusque and conservative traits he inherited from his grandfather, but also some sweet gentlemanly traits from his father. It makes him rather stuffy and old-fashioned, but he's a good guy, and becomes romantically involved with Da-jung.

Cast
Park Se-young as Jung Da-jung
Lee Sang-woo as Seo Jae-woo
Kim Mi-sook as Han Song-jung
Hwang Woo-seul-hye as Jung Da-ae
Go Woo-ri as Jung Da-in
Son Chang-min as Namgung Young
Choi Bool-am as Kim Chul-soo
Na Moon-hee as Lee Soon-ok
Kang Seok-woo as Seo Min-sik
Lee Mi-young as Kim Shin-ae
Kim Hyung-kyu as Seo In-woo
Jung Man-sik as Kang Hyun-bin
Kim Min-young as Mina
Jung Hye-sung as Lee So-yi
Lee Hong-bin as Yoo Ji-ho 
Kwak Si-yang as Jung Hee-joo
Kang Nam-gil as Da-jung's father
Leo as himself (Ep. 43)
Hyuk as himself (Ep. 43)
Jeon Soo-kyeong as House owner (cameo)

Awards and nominations

References

External links
 

Seoul Broadcasting System television dramas
2014 South Korean television series debuts
Korean-language television shows
South Korean romance television series
Television series by Logos Film